Christopher Kelly (born 1997) is an Irish Gaelic footballer who plays at club level with Éire Óg and at inter-county level with the Cork senior football team. He usually lines out as a goalkeeper.

Career

Kelly first played competitive Gaelic football with the Éire Óg club in Ovens and, after progressing through the juvenile and underage ranks, he soon joined the club's top adult team. He enjoyed his first major success when the club won the Cork SAFC title in 2021. Kelly first appeared on the inter-county scene with the Cork minor football team in 2015. He later linked up with the Cork under-21 and junior teams, while also lining out with the Cork Institute of Technology in the Sigerson Cup. Kelly was first selected for the Cork senior football team fin 2019, however, a period of suspension ruled him out of all activity for a year.

Career statistics

Honours

Éire Óg
Cork Senior A Football Championship: 2021

References

1997 births
Living people
Éire Óg (Cork) Gaelic footballers
CIT Gaelic footballers
Cork inter-county Gaelic footballers
Gaelic football goalkeepers